The McDowell Mountain Range (Yavapai: Wi:kajasa) is located about twenty miles north-east of downtown Phoenix, Arizona, and may be seen from most places throughout the city. The range is composed of miocene deposits left nearly five million years ago. The McDowells share borders with the cities of Fountain Hills, Scottsdale, and Maricopa County. The city of Scottsdale has made its share of the McDowells a preserve, and has set up a wide trail network in partnership with the McDowell Sonoran Conservancy. The McDowell Sonoran Conservancy was established in 1991. This mountain range also serves as a sacred marker to the Yavapai people. The boundaries of the range are generally defined by Saddleback Mountain in the South and Granite Mountain as the Northern boundary. The McDowells also comprise popular landmarks such as Pinnacle Peak and Tom's Thumb. Although technically a stand-alone, Mt. McDowell (referred to as Red Mountain by Phoenix residents), not to be confused with McDowell Peak, is sometimes listed on maps as a part of the McDowell Mountains.

Summits 
 East End (Arizona)
 Thompson Peak (Arizona)
 McDowell Peak
 Sunrise Peak
 Rock Knob

References 

 Thompson, C. (2004), Valley 101.

Additional Reading
 McDowell Rock – A Climber’s Guide. Erik Filsinger and Cheryl Beaver (2016) 134 pages.

External links 
 McDowell Mountain Regional Park
 Pictures and information about hike to natural spring and petroglyphs in the McDowell Mountains
 

Mountain ranges of the Sonoran Desert
Mountain ranges of Maricopa County, Arizona
Mountain ranges of Arizona